Treva is the historical original name-during the short-lived creation of the Roman province of Germania-of the actual city of Hamburg in Germany.

History

Romans reached the Elbe river under Augustus and conquered all the German territories west of this river. 
 	
Some evidences indicate that they built a "marching camp" in a small island of the estuary of the river Elbe, in a place where their ships could arrive (and be protected by a small port) when sailing from Flevum - a Roman port near the Rhine river. 	

 	
This place was called "Treva" and later probably had a small vicus populated by local Germans with some Roman merchants. The origin of the name is similar to the Latin name of Trier: tre from Latin "trans" (through) and va from German "var" (river).
 	
Indeed Lucius Domitius Ahenobarbus (the successor of Tiberius in Germania) commanded the Roman army to the area of Treva and crossed the Elbe around 4 BC, during which he set up an altar to Augustus (probably in the western area of Brandenburg). His campaign followed the one with the creation by Drusus of small fortifications (one could have been "Treva", but there it is no archaeological discovery about) along the rivers Weser and Elbe, done some years before.
 	

 	
So -after Drusus- Ahenobarbus penetrated further into the country than any of his predecessors had done. Furthermore, the future emperor Tiberius campaigned extensively while in Germany, even conducting some amphibious operations along the Elbe River in 5 AD and probably landing also in the surroundings of Treva. 	

 	
Later, Germanicus in 15 AD reached Treva and again crossed the Elbe river in his military campaign, before the final withdrawal of the Romans west of the Rhine river. 
 	
Claudius Ptolemy (2nd century AD) reported the first name for the vicinity as Treva. He also indicated that Treva was at the intersection of ancient commercial routes that have been used, among other things, for transporting the then very valuable amber.
 	
The actual name Hamburg comes from the first permanent building on the site, a castle which the Emperor Charlemagne ordered constructed in 808 AD. It rose on rocky terrain in a marsh between the River Alster and the River Elbe as a defence against Slavic incursion, and acquired the name Hammaburg (burg meaning castle or fort and hamma marshes in old German language).
 	

 	
Recent archaeological discoveries in the center of Hamburg have proved the existence of a trade settlement during Roman times. Furthermore, some gold roman coins have been discovered in Lokstedt (a section of Hamburg).

See also
 Germania
 Germania Antiqua
 Flevum
 Marktbreit

Notes

Bibliography

 Doyle, Nolan. The Pannonian Revolt, Teutoburg Forest and the Formation of Roman Frontiers. Senior Seminar: HST 499 Professor B.H.Hshieh. Western Oregon University June 15, 2007
 F. Langewiesche: Germanische Siedlungen im nordwestlichen Deutschland zwischen Rhein und Weser nach dem Berichte des Ptolemäus. Beilage zum Jahresbericht des Realprogymnasiums zu Bünde über das Schuljahr 1909/10.
 Kleineberg Andrea, Christian Marx, Eberhard Knobloch und Dieter Lelgemann (Hrsg.): Germania und die Insel Thule. Die Entschlüsselung von Ptolemaios’ Atlas der Oikumene, S. 29. Wissenschaftliche Buchgesellschaft, Darmstadt 2010, .
 J.-M.A.W.Morel. The early roman harbours. Velsen, in: R.W.Brandt, W.Groenman-van Waateringe & S.E.van der Leeuw (eds.), Assendelver Polder Papers 1, Amsterdam 1987, pags. 169–175. 
 Powell, Lindsay (2011). Eager for Glory: The Untold Story of Drusus the Elder, Conqueror of Germania. Barnsley, South Yorkshire: Pen & Sword Books. .
 Tacitus. Annals (Tacitus, Annals, I–VI, English translation)

Settlements in Germania Magna
Roman sites in Germany
Germania (Roman province)